Season 2000–01 was the 117th football season in which Dumbarton competed at a Scottish national level, entering the Scottish Football League for the 95th time, the Scottish Cup for the 106th time, the Scottish League Cup for the 54th time and the Scottish Challenge Cup for the 10th time.

Overview 
At the start of season 2000-01 Dumbarton would be without a home until their new stadium was ready - and would play their 'home' games 40 miles away at Coatbridge, the home of Albion Rovers.  The spell at Cliftonhill was not successful as only one 'home' game there was won - and by that time any chance of promotion had been lost.  At the beginning of November manager Jimmy Brown left the club to be replaced by his assistant Tom Carson.

The big day of the opening of the new home ground was 2 December.  A game between two of the bottom clubs in Division 3 would not normally have attracted a large turnout but as it was, an almost capacity crowd watched Dumbarton beat Elgin City 3-0.  Results post-move did improve and in the end a mid-table 6th-place finish was achieved.

In the national cup competitions, there was some progress in all. In the Scottish Cup, Dumbarton defeated East Stirling in the first round, after a drawn match, but disappointingly lost in the next round to Stranraer.

In the League Cup, after an exciting penalties win over Ayr United, Dumbarton lost out to Livingston in the second round.

Finally, in the Scottish Challenge Cup, after nine unsuccessful attempts, Dumbarton finally won a first round tie - against Elgin City, but the optimism was short-lived as Arbroath would win the second round match-up.

Locally, in the Stirlingshire Cup, Dumbarton won one and lost one of their two group ties, and failed to progress.

Results & fixtures

Scottish Third Division

Bell's Challenge Cup

CIS League Cup

Tennent's Scottish Cup

Stirlingshire Cup

League table

Player statistics

Squad 

|}

Transfers

Players in

Players out

Trivia
 The League match against Brechin City on 12 August marked Willie Wilson's 100th appearance for Dumbarton in all national competitions - the 115th Dumbarton player to reach this milestone.
 The League match against East Stirling on 9 September marked Craig Brittain's 100th appearance for Dumbarton in all national competitions - the 116th Dumbarton player to reach this milestone.
 The League match against Elgin City on 30 September marked Stephen Jack's 100th appearance for Dumbarton in all national competitions - the 117th Dumbarton player to reach this milestone.
 The League match against Elgin City on 2 December marked Alex Grace's and Paddy Flannery's 100th appearances for Dumbarton in all national competitions - the 118th and 119th Dumbarton players respectively to reach this milestone.
 The League match against Albion Rovers on 10 March marked Jamie Bruce's 100th appearance for Dumbarton in all national competitions - the 120th Dumbarton player to reach this milestone.
 The League match against Montrose on 31 March marked Joe Robertson's 100th appearance for Dumbarton in all national competitions - the 121st Dumbarton player to reach this milestone.

See also
 2000–01 in Scottish football

References

External links
John Wight (Dumbarton Football Club Historical Archive)
Alan Brown (Dumbarton Football Club Historical Archive)
G Dempsey (Dumbarton Football Club Historical Archive)
John Ritchie (Dumbarton Football Club Historical Archive)
S Wilson (Dumbarton Football Club Historical Archive)
Ryan Robinson (Dumbarton Football Club Historical Archive)
Chris Smith (Dumbarton Football Club Historical Archive)
Scottish Football Historical Archive

Dumbarton F.C. seasons
Scottish football clubs 2000–01 season